Jane Cowl (December 14, 1883 – June 22, 1950) was an American film and stage actress and playwright "notorious for playing lachrymose parts". Actress Jane Russell was named in Cowl's honor.

Biography

Cowl was born Jane Bailey in Boston, Massachusetts, to Charles Bailey and Grace Avery. She attended Erasmus Hall High School in Brooklyn, New York City. And she also took some courses at Columbia University.

She made her Broadway debut in New York City in Sweet Kitty Bellairs in 1903. Her first leading role was Fanny Perry in 1909 in Leo Ditrichstein's Is Matrimony a Failure?, produced by David Belasco, and then she played stock. This was followed by The Gamblers (1910), her first great success, and by Within the Law (1912), Common Clay (1915), and other successes (New International Encyclopedia). She was known for her interpretation of Shakespearean roles, playing Juliet, Cleopatra, and Viola on Broadway. She made Broadway history by playing Juliet over 1000 consecutive performances in 1923; critic George Jean Nathan declared her "not ... the best Juliet that I have seen, but she is by all odds the most charming". Cowl's affecting performances led her to be described as having a "voice with a tear." Biographer Charles Higham admired Cowl's "marvelous bovine eyes and exquisite genteel catch in the voice ..."

In June 1911, Cowl traveled on the maiden voyage from Southampton of the RMS Olympic, sister ship of the Titanic which was lost in a famous disaster the following April .

In 1930, Cowl appeared with a young Katharine Hepburn in the Broadway production of Benn W. Levy's play Art and Mrs. Bottle, and in 1934, she created the role of Lael Wyngate in S.N. Behrman's Rain from Heaven opposite actor John Halliday. Noting the challenges posed by Behrman's heightened dialogue, critic Gilbert Gabriel noted approvingly that their scenes together were "models of aristocratic parlando." She also starred in Noël Coward's Easy Virtue.

Cowl was the lead in two silent films, The Garden of Lies (1915) and The Spreading Dawn (1917). Then, after nearly 30 years away from films, she returned for several supporting roles in the 1940s. Her final film was Payment on Demand (1951) with Bette Davis.

Jane Cowl died of cancer in Santa Monica, California, on June 22, 1950, aged 66. Following cremation, her ashes were buried at Valhalla Memorial Park Cemetery.

A biography about Cowl, titled Jane Cowl: Her Precious and Momentary Glory, was published in 2004. It was written by Richard Abe King, who had formerly worked with Cowl.

Family

On June 18, 1906, at her father's apartment on Riverside Drive and 95th Street in New York City, Cowl married Adolph Edward Klauber, the drama critic of The New York Times. A former actor and son of a prominent Jewish photographer in Louisville, Kentucky, Klauber left the Times in 1918 to become a theatrical producer and manager. He and Cowl separated in 1930, shortly after his health began to fail. Klauber returned to live "in strict seclusion" in Louisville, where he died in 1933. The couple had no children.

Works
Cowl wrote several plays in collaboration with Jane Murfin.  They often used the joint pseudonym Allan Langdon Martin. Their works include:

 Lilac Time - 1917
 At Daybreak - 1917
 Information Please - 1918
 Smilin' Through - 1919
 The Jealous Moon - 1928

Filmography
The Garden of Lies (1915)
The Spreading Dawn (1917)
Once More, My Darling (1949)
No Man of Her Own (1950)
The Secret Fury (1950)
Payment on Demand (1951)

References

External links

 
 Jane Cowl at Women in American History website
 
 
 Allan Langdon Martin (pseudonym) at the Internet Broadway Database
 Jane Cowl papers, 1907-1949 (bulk 1927-1945), held by the Billy Rose Theatre Division, New York Public Library for the Performing Arts
 Jane Cowl portrait gallery at NYP Library
 first of three pages of photos shot by Nickolas Muray devoted to Jane Cowl(Wayback Machine)
 Jane Cowl photo gallery at Corbis
Jane Cowl University of Washington, Sayre collection
photo of Jane Cowl and Jane Murfin(Wayback Machine)

1883 births
1950 deaths
20th-century American dramatists and playwrights
American film actresses
American stage actresses
Actresses from Boston
People from Greater Los Angeles
Deaths from cancer in California
Burials at Valhalla Memorial Park Cemetery
Columbia University alumni
20th-century American women writers
20th-century American actresses
American women dramatists and playwrights
Erasmus Hall High School alumni